Guy Bernard Maddison (born 31 March 1965) is an Australian punk and grunge musician. From 1986 to 1989 he worked as a member of noise rock group Lubricated Goat and appeared on their album Paddock of Love. He was a member of Bloodloss (1993–97), a blues-punk band, alongside Mark Arm on vocals. From 2001 Maddison is the bass guitarist of the United States-based grunge band, Mudhoney (which includes Arm), and has worked on their studio albums, Since We've Become Translucent (2002), Under a Billion Suns (2006), The Lucky Ones (2008), Vanishing Point (2013), and Digital Garbage (2018).

Early years
Guy Bernard Maddison was born on 31 March 1965 and grew up in Perth, Western Australia.

1980s
Guy Maddison played in mid-1980s Perth-based punk group, Greenhouse Effect, with Paul Gill on guitar. By 1986 he moved to Sydney, he played bass guitar for noise rock band Lubricated Goat, sometimes under the pseudonym Buster Smallgoods, recording one album, Paddock of Love (July 1988). In 2003 Maddison recalled meeting Stu Spasm (aka Stuart Grey) by chance, "I was crossing the road one day on Cleveland Street ... and Stuart yelled out to me ... he asked me if I was doing anything and if I’d like to play the bass in Lubricated Goat" – they had previously met when Spasm was recording tracks in Perth with an earlier version of Lubricated Goat. The line-up of Lubricated Goat for Paddock of Love, alongside Maddison on bass guitar, and Spasm on vocals, guitar, synthesiser and bass guitar; were Pete Hartley on bass guitar and guitar; and Brett Ford on drums. In November 1988 the band lip-synched a nude performance of their track, "In the Raw", on the Australian Broadcasting Corporation TV program Blah Blah Blah, an event which created national media outrage. In 2009 Cousin Creep, an alternative music journalist, directed a documentary film, In the Raw, about the event.

In May 1989 Lubricated Goat followed with an extended play, Schadenfreude with Maddison and Spasm joined by Gene Ravet on drums (ex-Ragadoll, Space Juniors) and Charlie Tolnay on guitar (Grong Grong, King Snake Roost). Front man Spasm and Maddison were the only band members to tour the United States, they enlisted tour musicians, Renestair EJ on guitar and Martin Bland on drums. Maddison was an occasional member of the improvised group, The Unconscious Collective, and the mixed media experiment, Merge. In late 1989, after the US tour, Maddison left Lubricated Goat and formed a side project with former bandmate, Hartley. The new group was Monroe's Fur. At this time, Maddison relocated to Seattle, Washington.

1990s
In 1990 Guy Maddison was briefly a member of a studio group, Bushpig, on bass guitar and keyboards, with Tolnay (ex-Bloodloss) and Peter Hill (King Snake Roost) on vocals and harmonica. That year they issued a self-titled album on Hill's label, Practical Goat Keeping Records. In 1993, Maddison played bass guitar in the third incarnation of Bloodloss, a blues-punk band which had started in Adelaide, Australia in 1982. This version had formed in Seattle with Mark Arm (Mudhoney) on vocals, and Maddison's former bandmates Renestair and Bland. In November 1995 the group issued Live My Way on Warner / Reprise Records. Australian rock music historian, Ian McFarlane, felt they "played delta blues by way of Captain Beefheart and Jon Spencer Blues Explosion". On 1 January 1996, Bloodloss issued their next album, Misty. McFarlane found it showed "echoes of Pere Ubu, Thug and all manner of jazz and blues".

2000s
In 2001, after the departure of founding bass guitarist Matt Lukin, Maddison joined the band Mudhoney, reuniting with former Bloodloss bandmate Mark Arm. He has appeared on their studio albums, Since We've Become Translucent (2002), Under a Billion Suns (2006), The Lucky Ones (2008), Vanishing Point (2013), and Digital Garbage (2018).  In November 2011, Arm credited Maddison with reinvigorating his interest in the group after Lukin had left.

Personal life
In addition to his work as a musician, Maddison also worked as a critical care nurse at Harborview Medical Center.

Discography

With Lubricated Goat
 Paddock of Love, July 1988, Black Eye Records
 Schadenfreude, May 1989, EP Black Eye Records

With Bushpig
 Bushpig 1990, Practical Goat Keeping Records, PGK 001

With Monroe's Fur
 "New World Order Catalogue", 1991, Vinal Pollution Records
Fire/Green Horn, 1994, Carving Knife Records, CKR-011

With Bloodloss
Live My Way, November 1995
Misty, January 1996
"In a Gadda-da-Change",1994

With Mudhoney
Since We've Become Translucent, 2002
Under a Billion Suns, 2006
" Live in Mexico City", 2007
The Lucky Ones, 2008
Vanishing Point, 2013
Digital Garbage, 2018

References

General
  Note: Archived [on-line] copy has limited functionality.
Specific

External links
 The Last Laugh– August 2002 Seattle Weekly Article
 Mudhoney NSFAQ – August 2002 Everett True Article
 In the Raw – Guy Maddison interview from 2003
 Plan B Magazine – Mudhoney interview from August 2006
 Bass Guitar Magazine Guy Maddison interview in issue 29

Living people
Australian rock bass guitarists
Grunge musicians
Mudhoney members
Noise rock musicians
Lubricated Goat members
1965 births
Male nurses
Australian nurses